Korbinian Müller (born 6 February 1991) is a German professional footballer who plays as a goalkeeper.

Career
Müller joined FC St. Pauli in August 2018. He left the club at the end of the season where his contract expired. However, he signed a new deal with the club on 8 October 2019 until the end of the season.

References

External links

1991 births
Living people
Association football goalkeepers
German footballers
SpVgg Unterhaching II players
SpVgg Unterhaching players
Stuttgarter Kickers players
FC St. Pauli players
2. Bundesliga players
3. Liga players
Regionalliga players
People from Bad Tölz
Sportspeople from Upper Bavaria
Footballers from Bavaria